Małgorzata is a common Polish female given name derived through Latin Margarita from Ancient Greek μαργαρίτης (margarítēs), meaning "pearl". It is equivalent to the English "Margaret". Its diminutive forms include Małgośka, Małgosia, Gosia, Gośka, Gosieńka, Gosiunia.

Name days 
Individuals named Małgorzata celebrate their name day the day closest after their birthday. List of name days for the name Małgorzata: 
 January 12, 18
 February 22
 March 25
 April 10, 13
 May 27
 June 10
 July 13, 20
 August 27
 October 14, 17
 November 2, 16
 December 30

People and characters with the name Małgorzata 
 Goshka Macuga (born 1967), Polish-born artist
 Gosia Andrzejewicz (born 1984), Polish singer
 Gosia Baczyńska
 Małgorzata Dąbrowska (born 1956), Polish historian
 Małgorzata Dydek (1974-2011), Polish professional basketball player
 Małgorzata Foremniak (born 1967), Polish actress
 Małgorzata Gebel (born 1955), Polish actress
 Małgorzata Grajcar, Polish former competitive ice dancer
 Margret Grebowicz, (born 1973) Polish philosopher, author, and former jazz vocalist
 Małgorzata Jasińska, (born 1984), Polish racing cyclist
 Małgorzata Kalinowska-Iszkowska, (born 1946), Polish computer scientist, educator, and activist
 Małgorzata Klara
 Małgorzata Kosik
 Małgorzata Kożuchowska, (born 1971), Polish actress
 Małgorzata Omilanowska, (born 1960), Polish art historian and politician
 Małgorzata Pritulak, (born 1947), Polish theatre and film actress
 Małgorzata Rożniecka, (born 1978), Polish model and beauty queen, winner of Miss International 2001
 Małgorzata Szejnert (born 1936), Polish writer and journalist
 Małgorzata Szewczyk (1828-1905), Polish nun
 Małgorzata Tusk (born 1957), Polish historian, wife of politician Donald Tusk
 Małgorzata Uściłowska (born 1987), better known by her stage name Lanberry, Polish singer and song-writer
 Małgorzata Wypych, Polish politician
 Małgorzata Wysocka, (born 1979), Polish road cyclist
 Gosia Rdest, (born 1993), Polish racing driver and businesswoman
 Gosia Dobrowolska, (born 1958), Polish-born Australian actress

See also 
 Polish name

Given names derived from gemstones
Polish feminine given names